Mamungari Conservation Park (formerly known as Unnamed National Park, Unnamed Conservation Park and also known as the Unnamed Biosphere Reserve) is a protected area located in South Australia within the southern Great Victoria Desert and northern Nullarbor Plain about  west of Maralinga and  northwest of Ceduna.

History
The conservation park was proclaimed in 1970 as a national park under the then National Parks Act 1966 for the purpose of conserving "the environments of the Great Victoria Desert and protect wilderness values". It was not assigned a name in 1970 and was subsequently constituted as the Unnamed Conservation Park under the National Parks and Wildlife Act 1972. It was renamed as Mamungari Conservation Park on 30 November 2006.

This was the largest land return under native title in South Australia since Premier John Bannon's hand over of Maralinga lands in 1984.

Conservation status
It is one of fourteen United Nations Educational, Scientific and Cultural Organization (UNESCO) World Biosphere Reserves in Australia and obtained this status in 1977 with the name of the Unnamed Biosphere Reserve.

The conservation park is classified as an IUCN Category Ia protected area.  In 1980, it was listed on the now-defunct Register of the National Estate.

Management and access
The conservation park is managed jointly by the traditional owners, the Maralinga Tjarutja and Pila Nguru people, and the Department for Environment and Water.

The conservation park may only be visited by those who have obtained the minimum impact code and can demonstrate experience using that code. Permits are required to travel to the conservation park and will take 4 to 6 weeks to arrange. The only road of significance that passes through the conservation park is the Anne Beadell Highway.

See also
Protected areas of South Australia
List of biosphere reserves in Australia
Serpentine Lakes

References

External links
Mamungari Conservation Park official webpage
Mamungari Conservation Park webpage on protected planet
Webpage for the Unnamed Biosphere Reserve on the UNESCO website
The Friends of the Great Victoria Desert Parks webpage

Conservation parks of South Australia
Biosphere reserves of Australia
Nullarbor Plain
Protected areas established in 1970
1970 establishments in Australia
Co-managed protected areas in South Australia
South Australian places listed on the defunct Register of the National Estate
Great Victoria Desert